Filarmoniya Bağı (Filarmonia Park or Philharmonia Garden), sometimes called Gubernator's or Governor's Park, is a park in Baku, Azerbaijan, next to Baku fortress.

The park was established beginning in 1830; ship's captains coming from Iran were asked to bring a sack of soil to add to it. In the early 20th century, there were plans to create a concert hall in the park, but the necessary felling of trees led to objections. A summer pavilion was built. The park was renovated in the 1970s and then further renovated beginning in 2007 on orders of President Ilham Aliyev. An old-fashioned fountain designed by the French company Inter Art has been added.

References

External links

 Filarmoniya Bağı at Parks & Gardens 

Parks in Baku